Polonia Restituta (Latin for "Restored Poland") is a 1981 historical film based on a 1928 documentary of the same name.

The 1981 film was directed by Bohdan Poreba. The film's production companies were Lenfilm, Magyar Filmgyártó Vallalat, Zespol Filmowy "Profil", Barrandov Studios, and DEFA.

The 1928 film is held in the National Film Archive of the Audiovisual Institute and in the National Digital Archive.

Synopsis 
The 1981 film covers historical events that occurred from 1914 to 1919.

The 1928 film "presents events that contributed to regaining independence by Poland and to shaping its borders after the period of partitions. It was produced at the initiative of Józef Błeszyński in 1928, on the 10th anniversary of regaining independence. It was an important work in terms of propaganda as it showed the efforts of Poles fighting for the rebirth of their state."

Events in the 1928 film include details about the Polish army, the German occupation of Warsaw, the fight against Ukraine for Eastern Galicia, the liberation of Vilnius, the Polish–Soviet War, the Treaty of Warsaw, the conquest of Kyiv, and the Peace of Riga.

Cast 

 Krzysztof Chamiec
 Józef Fryzlewicz
 Janusz Zakrzeński
 Edmund Fetting

References

External links
 

1981 films
Polish historical films
1980s Polish-language films
1980s historical films